Viau may refer to:
 Viau, a provincial electoral district in Quebec
 Viau (Montreal Metro), a station on the Montreal Metro (subway)

People
 Caroline Viau Canadian para-alpine skier
 Fernand Viau, member of the Canadian House of Commons
 George Viau, French dentist and art collector
 Jacques Viau, Montreal lawyer
 Lee Viau, baseball player
 Roberto Viau, Argentinian basketball player
 Susana Viau (1944–2013), Argentinian journalist
 Théophile de Viau, French baroque poet and dramatist

See also
 Pont Viau, a bridge in Quebec
 Pont-Viau, Quebec, a district of the city of Laval, Quebec